Alan Breck Stewart (Gaelic: Ailean Breac Stiùbhart; c. 1711 – c. 1791) was a Scottish soldier and Jacobite. He was also a central figure in a murder case that inspired novels by Sir Walter Scott and Robert Louis Stevenson.

Life and the Appin murder

In accordance with the fosterage customs of the Highland clans, Alan Stewart and his brothers grew up under the care of their relative James of the Glen in Appin. His nickname, Breck, came from the Gaelic for "spotted", as his face bore scars from smallpox. Stewart enlisted in the British Army of George II in 1745, just before the Jacobite rising of that year. He fought at the Battle of Prestonpans, but deserted to the Highland Jacobites. He subsequently fought for the Jacobites, but after they were defeated at the Battle of Culloden, he fled to France, accompanying his commander and clan captain, Colonel Charles Stewart of Ardshiel (Ardshiel was not the chief of the Appin Stewarts, but took command in the absence of the chief). After joining one of the Scottish regiments serving in the French Army, Stewart was sent back to Scotland to collect rents for the exiled clan leaders and to recruit soldiers for the French crown.

On 14 May 1752, Colin Campbell of Glenure, the royal agent collecting rents from the Ardshiel Stewarts, was murdered. As Alan Stewart had previously publicly threatened Glenure and had enquired about his schedule for the day in question, a warrant was issued for his arrest. However, he evaded capture. He was tried in absentia and sentenced to death. His foster father, James, was convicted as an accessory to the murder and hanged. Later investigations suggest that the murderer could not have been Stewart. In the murder of Glenure, the British government saw the potential danger of Jacobite assassinations of their agents in the Highlands, on the one hand, and also a potential renewal of a Campbell/Stewart feud, on the other. The execution of James of the Glen increased the Stewarts' discontent. Locally, especially after he was immortalised in fiction, Alan Breck Stewart was portrayed as a romantic figure.

There is no record of what happened to Stewart after the trial. One common story, derived from Sir Walter Scott, is that he returned to military service for the French crown and served against the British in North America during the French and Indian War. Another tale, passed down through the Stewart family, is that he fled to Ireland and set up a farm. There are now many Stewart descendants living in Ireland.

The Alan Breck's Prestonpans Volunteer Regiment
Founded in 2007, the Alan Breck's Prestonpans Volunteer Regiment is a living history and battle re-enactment society focusing on the 1745 Rising and associated histories. Half of the society portray redcoat soldiers and half Jacobites, in recognition of Stewart's service on both sides of the conflict, and is accordingly named after him. The society is based in Prestonpans, East Lothian, but performs at events around the country and has members from across Scotland.

References

Sources
Nicholson, Eirwen E. C.  "Allan Stewart", in Matthew, H.C.G. and Brian Harrison, eds.  The Oxford Dictionary of National Biography.  vol. 52, 628.  London: OUP, 2004.
Nimmo, Ian (2005). Walking with Murder: On the Kidnapped Trail. Birlinn Ltd. Paperback.
Gibson, Rosemary.  "The Appin Murder: In Their Own Words"  History Scotland. Vol.3 No.1 January/February 2003
MacArthur, Lt. Gen. Sir William: 'The Appin Murder and the Trial of James Stewart' (1960) JMP Publishing.
Hunter, Professor James.'Culloden and the Last Clansman'

External links
The Scotsman article on James of the Glen's death
The Appin Murder in Pictures, from the BBC

British Army soldiers
People convicted of murder by Scotland
Jacobite military personnel of the Jacobite rising of 1745
People sentenced to death in absentia
Prisoners sentenced to death by Scotland
Scottish Jacobites
Scottish military personnel
Scottish people convicted of murder
Scottish prisoners sentenced to death
Year of birth uncertain
Year of birth unknown
Year of death unknown